The 2023 Belgian Road Cycling Cup (known as the Lotto Cycling Cup for sponsorship reasons) is the eighth edition of the Belgian Road Cycling Cup.

Events 
The event schedule was revealed in February 2023 and involves the same races as the previous season, with the only exception the Ronde van Drenthe which dropped out.

Race results

Le Samyn

Grote Prijs Jean-Pierre Monseré

Standings

References

External links 
  

Belgian Road Cycling Cup
Belgian Road Cycling Cup
Road Cycling Cup